{{DISPLAYTITLE:C10H17NO}}
The molecular formula C10H17NO (molar mass: 167.25 g/mol, exact mass: 167.1310 u) may refer to:

 Benzyltrimethylammonium hydroxide
 N-Cyclohexyl-2-pyrrolidone

Molecular formulas